Neofit Peak is an ice-covered peak rising to 1750 m in Imeon Range on Smith Island in the South Shetland Islands, Antarctica.  Situated 1.12 km south-southwest of Slaveykov Peak, 3.1 km southwest of the summit Mount Foster, 2.38 km northeast of Riggs Peak and 10.98 km northeast of Cape James.  Overlooking Gramada Glacier to the south, and Armira Glacier to the east and southeast.  Bulgarian early mapping in 2009.  Named after the Bulgarian monk, scholar and artist Neofit Rilski (1793–1881) who translated the Bible into modern Bulgarian language.

Maps
Chart of South Shetland including Coronation Island, &c. from the exploration of the sloop Dove in the years 1821 and 1822 by George Powell Commander of the same. Scale ca. 1:200000. London: Laurie, 1822.
  L.L. Ivanov. Antarctica: Livingston Island and Greenwich, Robert, Snow and Smith Islands. Scale 1:120000 topographic map. Troyan: Manfred Wörner Foundation, 2010.  (First edition 2009. )
 South Shetland Islands: Smith and Low Islands. Scale 1:150000 topographic map No. 13677. British Antarctic Survey, 2009.
 Antarctic Digital Database (ADD). Scale 1:250000 topographic map of Antarctica. Scientific Committee on Antarctic Research (SCAR). Since 1993, regularly upgraded and updated.
 L.L. Ivanov. Antarctica: Livingston Island and Smith Island. Scale 1:100000 topographic map. Manfred Wörner Foundation, 2017.

References
 Neofit Peak. SCAR Composite Antarctic Gazetteer
 Bulgarian Antarctic Gazetteer. Antarctic Place-names Commission. (details in Bulgarian, basic data in English)

External links
 Neofit Peak. Adjusted Copernix satellite image

Mountains of Smith Island (South Shetland Islands)
Bulgaria and the Antarctic
Neofit Rilski